Judeo-Iraqi Arabic, also known as Iraqi Judeo-Arabic and Yahudic, is a variety of Arabic spoken by Iraqi Jews currently or formerly living in Iraq. It is estimated that there are  speakers in Israel (as of 2018) and that just 120 older speakers remain in Iraq (as of 1992). The best known variety is Baghdad Jewish Arabic, although there were different dialects in Mosul and elsewhere.

The vast majority of Iraqi Jews have relocated to Israel and have switched to using Hebrew as their home language.

The 2014 film Farewell Baghdad is performed mostly in Baghdad Jewish Arabic, the first time a movie has been filmed in Judeo-Iraqi Arabic.

Samples 
Writing Sample
Speaking Sample
OLAC resources in and about the Judeo-Iraqi Arabic language

Notes 

Jews and Judaism in Iraq
Judeo-Arabic languages
Mashriqi Arabic
Languages of Israel
Endangered Afroasiatic languages
Languages of Iraq
Jewish Iraqi history
Arabic languages